Himachal Pradesh Cricket Association Stadium, abbreviated as the HPCA Stadium, is a beautiful picturesque cricket stadium located in the city of Dharamshala in the Kangra district of Himachal Pradesh, India.

The town of Dharamsala is best known internationally as the home of the Dalai Lama of Tibet. It is also considered as one of the most beautiful cricket grounds in the world.

Location and history

The stadium served as the home ground for the Himachal Pradesh cricket team for Ranji Trophy matches and other domestic matches. The stadium also hosted some IPL matches as a home stadium for Kings XI Punjab.

The picturesque venue is unique in India as it is situated at an altitude of 1,457 m above the sea level and has the snow-capped Himalayan mountains in the background. Getting to Dharamsala from the nearby Kangra Airport, which is about 8 kilometres away through the hilly terrain and the harsh winters, during which it rains and snows, is a deterrent to organizing regular matches.

Dav Whatmore, the former Director of the National Cricket Academy in India had recommended during his tenure that the stadium is suitable for hosting international cricket matches. The first international team who played in this ground was the Pakistani cricket team, when they played a warm-up match against an India A side in 2005.

The first One Day International (ODI) at this stadium was played between India and England on 27 January 2013. England won the match by 7 wickets. The first Test at this stadium was played between India and Australia from 25 to 29 March 2017.India won the Test match comfortably by 8 wickets.

In November 2015, the HPCA stadium was selected as one of the six new Test match venues in India along with the Maharashtra Cricket Association Stadium, JSCA International Stadium Complex, Saurashtra Cricket Association Stadium, Holkar Stadium and Dr. Y.S. Rajasekhara Reddy ACA-VDCA Cricket Stadium.

ACC Centre of Excellence
In December 2015, Asian Cricket Council decided to set up Centre of Excellence at Dharamshala.

2016 ICC World Twenty20

On 21 July 2015, the BCCI announced the names of the eight cities which would be hosting matches during the 2016 ICC World Twenty20. Dharamshala was announced as one of the eight venues for the event. On 11 December 2015, ICC announced the fixtures of the event where the HPCA Stadium was scheduled to host all the first round Group A matches and a single Super 10 Group 2 match. Originally the marquee India vs Pakistan match was scheduled to be hosted by this venue. Due to security concerns for the Pakistani team, the match was moved to Eden Gardens, Kolkata.

List of centuries

Key
 * denotes that the batsman was not out.
 Inns. denotes the number of the innings in the match.
 Balls denotes the number of balls faced in an innings.
 NR denotes that the number of balls was not recorded.
 Parentheses next to the player's score denotes his century number at Edgbaston.
 The column title Date refers to the date the match started.
 The column title Result refers to the player's team result

Test Centuries

One Day Internationals

Twenty20 Internationals

List of Five Wicket Hauls

Key

Tests

References

Cricket grounds in Himachal Pradesh
Buildings and structures in Dharamshala
Rugby union stadiums in India
Test cricket grounds in India
2003 establishments in Himachal Pradesh